Briceño is a town and municipality in Antioquia Department, Colombia. Part of the subregion of Northern Antioquia.

Climate
Briceño has a relatively cool tropical rainforest climate (Af) due to altitude. It has very heavy rainfall year round.

References

External links
 Briceno official website

Municipalities of Antioquia Department